Muranovo is the Fyodor Tyutchev state museum located in Pushkino, Moscow Oblast, Russia.

The estate was founded in 1816 and since then has belonged to four families, including Fyodor Tyutchev's family. Its main house was built in wood in 1842 by Yevgeny Baratynsky, another renowned Russian poet.  In August 1920, the estate became a museum.

Muranovo contains many historically important relics such as original furniture, manuscripts and artwork, which originally belonged to Tyutchev, Baratynsky and their families.

In July 2006, a fire from a lightning nearly destroyed the main building.  Nevertheless, almost all exhibits were saved, and the estate has since been restored.

References

External links 
 An encyclopedia of Russian museums (An article about the history of Muranovo)

1816 establishments in the Russian Empire

1920 establishments in Russia

Local museums in Russia
Literary museums in Russia
Museums in Moscow Oblast
Museums established in 1920
Historic house museums in Russia
Cultural heritage monuments of federal significance in Moscow Oblast